Hermann Eppenhoff (19 May 1919 – 10 April 1992) was a German football player and manager.

Career 
The forward was a member of FC Schalke 04 squad, which won the German Championship in the years 1939, 1940 and 1942. He also won three caps with the German national team.

Coaching career 
Later on he served as a manager for Borussia Dortmund, winning the German Championship in 1963 and also making it to the final of the DFB-Pokal in the same year. Two years later he won the 1964–65 DFB-Pokal with Dortmund. After switching to Meidericher SV he made it to the cup final once again in 1965–66, where his team was defeated by Bayern Munich. After several years at VfL Bochum, where he made the cup final yet again in 1967–68, he eventually switched to VfB Stuttgart.

Filmography
 Das Grosse Spiel (1942)

1919 births
1992 deaths
German footballers
Germany international footballers
FC Schalke 04 players
VfL Bochum managers
Borussia Dortmund managers
German football managers
People from the Province of Westphalia
VfB Stuttgart managers
MSV Duisburg managers
Bundesliga managers
SG Union Solingen managers
Association football forwards
Footballers from North Rhine-Westphalia
West German footballers
West German football managers